The Beaver River is a river in the west of Thunder Bay District in Northwestern Ontario, Canada. It is part of the Hudson Bay drainage basin, and is a right tributary of the Firesteel River.

Course

References

Sources

Rivers of Thunder Bay District
Tributaries of Hudson Bay